The Port Townsend Film Festival began screening independent films in 1999.

Today, PTFF has expanded to eight theatres and screens over 90 films, mid-September, in Port Townsend's walkable National Historic District. Port Townsend, Washington, United States). Port Townsend is at the end of a peninsula surrounded by Port Townsend Bay, Admiralty Inlet and the Strait of Juan de Fuca. It is adjacent to Olympic National Park.

Theatres include the beautifully restored vaudevillian-era Rose Theatre and crystal-chandeliered "Starlight Room," with views of the snow-peaked Cascade mountains. Five more theatres are "created" in downtown buildings for the three-day weekend by installing large screens, projectors and state-of-the-art sound. Theatre seating ranges from 46 to 250.

Independent documentary and narrative film submissions are accepted from January–May, and are evaluated by a team of 26 reviewers. The Festival charges a small fee for submissions. Additionally, programmer Jane Julian attends larger festivals, such as Sundance, to select films and to invite chosen filmmakers to attend the Festival in person.

PTFF's mission is "to spark community by connecting filmmakers & audiences." More than 60 filmmakers attend the Festival. Passholders can choose from 42 films being screened each day, many of them with Q&A afterwards. Filmmaker panel discussions – with, say, composers or screenwriters; covering topics like indie film challenges; the popular recurring "storytelling" panel – are Saturday and Sunday mornings and open to passholders at any level.

Special Guests of the Festival (actors, directors and filmmakers of note, see below) meet students at local school assemblies, as well as speak to adult audiences during hour-long interviews after their films have screened. In April, the Festival invites women directors, producers, screenwriters and other film professionals for a weekend of "Women & Film", held at the Rose and Rosebud Theatres, with a special screening and a filmmaker roundtable at Fort Worden State Park's 250-seat Wheeler Theatre.

The Festival has more than 250 volunteers to assist with managing the Festival. PTFF operates year-round with a staff of three, and is supported by donors, local small businesses and pass sales.

The most popular gathering place between films during the Festival is Area 51, "The Festival Bar on the Dock." Housed in a small historic building on the city dock, the bar overlooks Port Townsend Bay.

The city also closes off one block of Taylor Street in front of the Rose Theatre in downtown Port Townsend during Festival days to house the Taylor Street Outdoor Theatre. The Outdoor Movie, which begins at dusk (7:30 p.m.), offers a free kid-friendly film each night of the Festival. The Outdoor Movie is projected onto a gigantic inflatable screen, nicknamed after the orca whale Keiko, with seating on straw bales.

Pass sales range from a one pass ($40) to Patron Pass with access to all parties ($1,500). The "Festival" level pass includes Friday's "Dinner on Taylor Street." More than 650 passholders and filmmakers are served.

All passes include a year-long Festival membership with film library privileges and discounted ticket and popcorn price to "First Tuesday Salon," held each month at the Rose Theatre. The Salon screens a film currently in national distribution, with an invited guest, often a film academic, to discuss various aspects of the film.

Schedules, links to film trailers, film synopsis, and filmmaker interviews are posted by August 10 at http:// www.ptfilmfest.com

Noteworthy guests
The following actors, directors, screenwriters, producers, critics and authors have made appearances at PTFF:

2000
Actor Tony Curtis
Film Historian Robert Osborne
2001
Actress Eva Marie Saint
Actor Vincent Schiavelli
2002
Actress Patricia Neal
Screenwriter Stewart Stern (Rebel Without a Cause, The Ugly American)
2003
Actress Shirley Knight
Actor / Director Peter Fonda
Actress Verna Bloom
Film critic / Screenwriter Jay Cocks
Screenwriter Stewart Stern (Rebel Without a Cause)
Director Mark Decena (Dopamine (film))
Actor John Livingston (Dopamine (film))
2004
Actress Jane Powell
Former Child Actor Dickie Moore
Writer Tom Robbins
Director Zana Briski (Academy Award winner Born into Brothels)
Actor Tshewang Dendup (Travellers and Magicians)
2005
Actress Debra Winger 
Actor / Director Arliss Howard 
Mountaineer Jim Whittaker
2006
Actor Malcolm McDowell
Actress Greta Gerwig (LOL (2006 film))
Director Joe Swanberg (LOL (2006 film))
Producer Mike Kaplan (The Whales of August)
Filmmaker Linda Hattendorf (The Cats of Mirikitani)
2007
Actor Elliott Gould
Actress Melissa Leo
Director Charles Burnett
Poet Billy Collins
2008
Actress Piper Laurie
Writer / Producer Sherman Alexie
2009
Actress Cloris Leachman
Author Gail Buckley (Daughter of Lena Horne)
2010
Actress / Director Dyan Cannon
Radio Host Sedge Thomson
2011
Actor / Screenwriter / Director Buck Henry
Film Critic Moira MacDonald (The Seattle Times)
2012
Actor Bruce Dern
Actress / Singer Chely Wright
Composer / Keyboardist Wayne Horvitz
Radio Host Sedge Thomson
2013
Actress Karen Allen
Mountaineer Lou Whittaker 
Film Critic Robert Horton
2014
Director / Writer John Sayles
Producer Maggie Renzi
Filmmaker Lynn Shelton
Director / Writer Ari Seth Cohen
Author Daniel James Brown
Film Critic Robert Horton
2015
Actor Beau Bridges
Actor Chris Cooper
Actress / Writer Marianne Leone Cooper
Director Ali Selim
Producer Jim Bigham Sweet Land
2016
Actor / Writer Andrew Perez
Actress / Director Karen Allen
Director / Composer Alexander Janko (Year by the Sea, My Big Fat Greek Wedding)
Director Charlie Soap (The Cherokee Word for Water)
2017
Director Morgan Neville (20 Feet from Stardom)
Director / Actress Karen Allen
Editor / Producer Doug Blush
Astronaut Trainee Alyssa Carlson
'Bionic' Chef Eduardo Garcia
2018
Actor / Director / Activist Danny Glover
Director Charles Burnett
Director Jane Campion
Filmmaker Rayka Zehtabchi (Academy Award winner Period. End of Sentence.)
Director Tedy Necula (Beside Me)
Director / Screenwriter Megan Griffiths
Human Rights Advocate Rais Bhuiyan
2019
Actor Stephen Tobolowsky
Writer Cheryl Strayed
Director / Actress Karen Allen
Director Michael Brown (film director)
Director Ward Serrill (The Heart of the Game)
Editor / Producer Doug Blush (20 Feet from Stardom)
Film Critic / Author Robert Horton (National Society of Film Critics, Scarecrow Project)
Film Critic Moira Macdonald (The Seattle Times)
Co-publisher & Co-editor Joseph Bednarik (Copper Canyon Press)
Educator / Film Producer Warren Etheredge
2020 Virtual Festival only
2021 Virtual Festival only
2022 
Former Director & Programmer John Cooper (Sundance Film Festival)
Filmmakers Jared and Jerusha Hess (Napoleon Dynamite)

History
The Port Townsend Film Festival is a 501c3 non-profit, now in its 17th year. It occupies offices year-round in the historic Baker Block Building, at 211 Taylor Street, Suite 401-A, 98368. (360) 379–1333. From the beginning the Festival has maintained a film library of Festival films, available to members.

The Festival is juried each year by a team of film professionals. In 2016, and annually, PTFF will award "The Jim Ewing Young Director Award" in memory of Jim Ewing, one of the Festival's founders.

In 2014 the Festival began its "Film Fellowship" program, offered to one film professional needing several months of rent-free housing to work on a project.

In 2013 the Festival began offering annual Festival scholarships (two-night free lodging and festival passes) to film and journalism students.

The Festival also, from the beginning, has partnered with local non-profits at no charge, to provide films that help support their missions.

The largest annual fundraiser for PTFF is held in late February or early March, with live music, dinner, drinks, and a simulcast of the Oscars.

Founders
The Port Townsend Film Festival founders, Jim Ewing, Rocky Friedman, Jim Westall, and Linda Marie Yakush, were all veteran attendees of the Telluride Film Festival in Telluride, Colorado. That festival served as the model for the Port Townsend event. The PTFF founders also established an organizing committee consisting of Erik Andersson, Nancy Biery, Michael Harvey, Sherry Jones, Peter Simpson, and George Yakush.

Future festival dates
Focus: Women & Film, April 12–14, 2019; 20th Annual Film Festival Sept. 20–22, 2019.

References

External links
Port Townsend Film Festival Official Site

Film festivals in Washington (state)
Festivals in the Puget Sound region
Port Townsend, Washington